Bancpost was a Romanian bank based in Bucharest and a former member of Eurobank Ergasias Group. It official merged with Banca Transilvania on January 3, 2019.

See also

 Eurobank Ergasias
 Bulgarian Postbank
 Eurobank a.d.

External links
 Official site 
 Exchange rates of banks

Banks of Romania
Companies based in Bucharest
Banks established in 1991
Privatized companies in Romania
1991 establishments in Romania